Pericasta is a monotypic beetle genus in the family Cerambycidae described by Elizabeth Schatz Dillon and Lawrence Samuel Dillon in 1952. Its only species, Pericasta virescens, was described by Per Olof Christopher Aurivillius in 1920.

References

Onciderini
Beetles described in 1920
Monotypic beetle genera